Macherio is a comune (municipality) in the Province of Monza and Brianza in the Italian region Lombardy, located about  northeast of Milan.

The municipality of Macherio contains the frazioni (subdivisions, mainly villages and hamlets) Bareggia, Pedresse, and Belvedere.

Macherio borders the following municipalities: Triuggio, Lesmo, Sovico, Biassono, Lissone.

Demographic evolution

References

External links
 www.comune.macherio.mb.it